James Benning (born 4 May 1983 in Mill Hill, London) is an English cricketer who played for Leicestershire County Cricket Club and Surrey. He is a right-hand bat and right-arm medium pace bowler. Benning played for the minor county team, Buckinghamshire, in 2001, in one Under-19 "Test" for England in 2002 and joined Surrey in 2003.

Benning won the NBC Denis Compton Award for young players in 2003.

James, who used to attend Caterham School, shared in a one-day world record 496-4 (with Surrey) in 2007. He and Ali Brown, also a former Caterham School pupil, put on 296 opening for Surrey, with Benning going on to make 152.

He finished the 2005/06 domestic one day campaign with the highest average of any county player.  After leaving Surrey he joined Leicestershire, but was released after the 2010 season.

References
Surrey County Cricket Club official website
Cricket Archive page on James Benning
Cricinfo page on James Benning

1983 births
Living people
English cricketers
People educated at Caterham School
Surrey cricketers
Buckinghamshire cricketers
Leicestershire cricketers
People from Mill Hill